Richard Fa'aoso (born 8 May 1984), also known by the nicknames of "Richie", and "Fuss", is a former Tonga international rugby league footballer.

Background
Fa'aoso is of Australian, Sāmoan and Tongan descent. His father is Sāmoan and Tongan, while his mother is Australian.

He was educated at Wavell State High School. Fa'aoso played his junior football for Norths Aspley before being signed by the Penrith Panthers.

Playing career

Penrith Panthers

In Round 14 of the 2004 NRL season, Fa'aoso made his NRL début for the Panthers against the St. George Illawarra Dragons.

Sydney Roosters
In 2005, he joined the Sydney Roosters and played 21 games for them during the year.

Castleford Tigers
In 2006, Fa'aoso played for the Castleford Tigers in the Super League, who signed him after their promotion in 2005.

Parramatta Eels
In 2007, he returned to Australia, signing with The Parramatta Eels for 3 years. He was touted as a replacement for departing Eel Michael Vella who left the Eels to join Super League club Hull Kingston Rovers in 2007.

Newcastle Knights
After 2007, Fa'aoso was released to sign a 2-year deal with the recently cleaned out, Brian Smith-coached Newcastle Knights. During 2008, Fa'aoso became a permanent first-grader for Newcastle, earning a new 3-year contract for the Knights after making 45 appearances and scoring 7 tries for the club. Fa'aoso made another 46 appearances, scoring 3 tries during 2010 and 2011, making the Knights the club that he has spent the most time with.

In 2012 Wayne Bennett took over as coach of the Knights and at the halfway stage of the season Fa'aoso had only made 8 appearances for the team. He was told that he wouldn't be re-signed for 2013 after 99 games and wouldn't be stopped if he were to find a new club to join mid-season before 30 June transfer deadline.

Melbourne Storm
On 27 June 2012, Fa'aoso traveled to Melbourne to have a fitness test in order to sign with the Melbourne Storm for the remainder of the 2012 season. He officially signed with the Storm later that afternoon. The Storm's general manager of Football Operations, Frank Ponissi, said the signing of Fa'aoso was a welcome addition to their NRL squad : "We see Richie's signing as a chance to bring some further experience and strength to our roster." Fa'aoso left the Knights as a fan favourite, playing 99 games and scoring 12 tries. Fa'aoso said about the move “I have had a ball at the Knights and I will always have great mates here, I thank the Knights for the opportunity and to everyone for their efforts; the coaches, my teammates, the trainers, just everyone at the Club for all they have done for me. Wayne (Bennett) was great to give me a chance at the start of the season and I am disappointed I was unable to make the most of it. I also want to say thank you to all of the Knights fans for your support. The time is right for me to move on and I wish the Knights all the best for the rest of the season and beyond.”

On 30 September 2012, Fa'aoso came off the bench in the Melbourne Storm's 2012 NRL Grand Final win over the Canterbury-Bankstown Bulldogs. He played a total of 6 games for the club.

Manly Warringah Sea Eagles
On 10 July 2012, just 13 days after signing with Melbourne, Fa'aoso signed a 2-year deal with the Manly Warringah Sea Eagles starting in 2013, despite not yet having played a game for the Melbourne Storm.

Towards the end of the 2013 NRL season, Fa'aoso broke his neck. In February 2014, doctors advised him never to play Rugby league again. He subsequently announced his retirement from Rugby league.

Parramatta Eels second stint
In September 2014, Fa'aoso was cleared for a shock comeback to the NRL from his broken neck. On 30 October 2014, he signed a 1-year contract with the Parramatta Eels starting in 2015. However the NRL did not register the contract, after Fa'aoso could not secure adequate insurance cover for his return.

On 2 April 2015, Fa'aoso was cleared to return to the playing field. He made his return in Round 7 of the 2015 NRL season against his former team Newcastle Knights. Shortly after getting on the field, Fa'aoso suffered a concussion from a head knock and was taken off, he subsequently failed the concussion test and was ruled out for the remainder of the match.

In October 2015, Fa'aoso again announced his retirement.

Representative career
Fa'aoso made his international début for Tonga in 2006, playing 4 tests.

In August 2008, Fa'aoso was named in the Tonga training squad for the 2008 World Cup, and in October 2008 he was named in the final 24-man Tonga squad.

Fa'aoso was again selected for the Tongan national team in 2009 for the Pacific Cup. He was named Tongan player of the year for 2009.

On 20 April 2013, Fa'aoso played for Tonga in their Pacific Rugby League International match with Samoa.

On 2 May 2015, Fa'aoso made his 10th appearance for Tonga in his country's clash against Pacific rivals Samoa in the 2015 Polynesian Cup.

Achievements and accolades

Team
2012 NRL Grand Final: Melbourne Storm – Winners

References

External links
2015 Parramatta Eels profile
Castleford Tigers statistics

1984 births
Living people
Australian sportspeople of Tongan descent
Australian rugby league players
Castleford Tigers players
Manly Warringah Sea Eagles players
Melbourne Storm players
Newcastle Knights players
Parramatta Eels players
Penrith Panthers players
Rugby league players from Brisbane
Rugby league props
Sydney Roosters players
Tonga national rugby league team players
Wyong Roos players